Lincoln Academy was an elementary school and secondary school, including boarding students, for African-American children in Kings Mountain, North Carolina, United States. It was founded in 1886 by Miss E. C. Prudden (or Pruden).

In 1888, the American Missionary Association (AMA) of the Congregational Church took over the administration, and the school became co-educational in 1889.

Location

History

It was first founded in 1866 after the American Civil War as a school for African-American girls by E. C. Pruden, a young woman missionary from Massachusetts. The American Missionary Association took over administration in 1888, after founding and operating numerous schools in the South for freedmen and their children. It operated the school for more than 20 years, with Miss L. S. Cathcart and others as leaders. It admitted boys from 1889, becoming coeducational.  In the segregated rural South, there were few schools for African-American children, and Lincoln Academy aspired to give them strong educations. 

In the following decade, enrollment increased, a new building was constructed, and dormitories were added. Cathcart Memorial Hall was added in 1900, and additional buildings were constructed over the following 20 years.

In 1916, there were 12 teachers and more than 200 students, 68 of whom were boarding students. The remainder were day students from the region. The academy had 11 buildings. A mothers' meeting was held weekly to discuss issues. Two teachers also conducted reading circles. The pastor of the Lincoln Academy Church influenced instruction. 

Principal I. Alva Hart said at the time:

Class room work at Lincoln Academy, no doubt, is like class room work in any other secondary school under the A. M. A. For example in teaching our aim is not to teach subjects alone, but through the subjects to teach the student how to think and what to think. ...  Every pupil and every problem that comes up is an original one and the teacher must find an original way to solve it; must define words because the vocabulary is so small; must interpret thought because the comprehension of relation is so meager. Moreover the pupils so lack concentration that to hold their attention is always a problem within itself. Then their 'had wents', 'done gone', 'mountings', 'fountings', 'aim to go', 'figered to do so', 'met up with', the vocabulary of their homes, make the task seem as large as King's Mountain itself. History means little to them because their people have played such a small part in the history we study. But they wake up when the teacher can bring to them an illustration where their people have taken an active and honorable part. It is a great pleasure to see most of them working with a determination to be better prepared for the great struggle of life that is before them.

The state of North Carolina began the process of converting the academy into a public school in 1922. The school added the eighth grade program in 1938–39, and the academy attained accreditation through the North Carolina State Board of Education at that time. In 1943, the AMA tried to increased community involvement in the school. Edgar D. Wilson was appointed as director in the following year. Gaston County took over the school's administration in 1947, but the AMA continued to serve the students who were boarding. When the state and county finally opened new public schools for African-American students in 1955, the academy was closed.

Notable students
 John T. Biggers, muralist who came to prominence toward the end of World War II, founding chairman of art department at Texas Southern University  
 Otto Briggs, baseball outfielder in the Negro leagues; played from 1915 to 1934, mostly with the Hilldale Club and the Bacharach Giants
 Ivan Dixon, actor, director, and producer, best known for his role in the 1960s sitcom Hogan's Heroes
 Pearl Anna Neal, music educator, one of the "Five Pearls" or founders of Zeta Phi Beta

See also
Orishatukeh Faduma, former assistant principal

References
Sources

Notes

Bibliography

African-American history of North Carolina
Kings Mountain, North Carolina
Defunct schools in North Carolina
American Missionary Association
Educational institutions established in 1886
Historically black schools
Schools in Gaston County, North Carolina
Defunct girls' schools in the United States
1886 establishments in North Carolina
Girls' schools in North Carolina